Nekmíř is a municipality and village in Plzeň-North District in the Plzeň Region of the Czech Republic. It has about 500 inhabitants.

Administrative parts
The village of Lhotka is an administrative part of Nekmíř.

Notable people
Aleš Mandous (born 1992), footballer

References

Villages in Plzeň-North District